The 1956 Individual Speedway World Championship was the 11th edition of the official World Championship to determine the world champion rider.

The World final was sponsored by the Sunday Dispatch and was televised live. Despite being televised a crowd of 65,000 saw the first Scandinavian winner in 23 year old Ove Fundin from Sweden.

Nordic Final
8 June 1956
 Linköping
 First 7 to European final

Continental Final
Fritz Dirtl was tragically killed competing in the Continental final. He was involved in a crash with fellow Austrian rider Josef Kamper and the fell into the path of Mieczysław Połukard.
10 June 1956
 Oberhausen
 First 7 to European Final

Championship Round
Venues
7 events in Great Britain
(Peter Craven seeded to World final)

Scores
First 11 to World final + 1 reserve

European Final
8 July 1956
 Oslo
 First 4 to World final plus 1 reserve

World final
22 September 1956
 London, Wembley Stadium

Classification

References

1956
Individual World Championship
Individual Speedway World Championship
Individual Speedway World Championship
Speedway competitions in the United Kingdom